Roselawn–Forest Heights Historic District is a national historic district located at Hammond, Lake County, Indiana.   The district encompasses 107 contributing buildings in a predominantly residential section of Hammond. It developed between about 1922 and 1962, and includes notable example of Colonial Revival, Tudor Revival, Bungalow / American Craftsman, and American Small House and eclectic styles of residential architecture. Located in the district is the separately listed George John Wolf House.

It was listed in the National Register of Historic Places in 2012.

References

Historic districts on the National Register of Historic Places in Indiana
Colonial Revival architecture in Indiana
Tudor Revival architecture in Indiana
Historic districts in Hammond, Indiana
National Register of Historic Places in Lake County, Indiana